Rennera is a genus of South African flowering plants in the daisy family.

 Species
 Rennera eenii (S.Moore) Källersjö - South Africa
 Rennera laxa (Bremek. & Oberm.) Källersjö - South Africa
 Rennera limnophila Merxm. - South Africa
 Rennera stellata P.P.J. Herman - South Africa

References

Anthemideae
Asteraceae genera
Endemic flora of South Africa